Andreas Wingerli (born September 11, 1997) is a Swedish professional ice hockey forward. He is currently playing with Skellefteå AIK of the Swedish Hockey League (SHL).

Playing career
Wingerli as a youth played with hometown club, Lycksele SK, at the under-18 and fourth tier Division.2 level. Wingerli joined the Skellefteå AIK program as a 15-year old, making his professional senior debut in the Swedish Hockey League during the 2014–15 SHL season on 8 January 2015.

In the 2015–16 season, Wingerli broke out offensively with Skellefteå AIK in the J20 SuperElit, leading the team in points-per-game, while splitting the season between junior and professional. Having secured a two-year senior contract extension with Skellefteå, Wingerli finished the regular season with 2 goals and 3 points in 38 appearances. He featured in 10 post-season games, helping Skellefteå AIK reach the Championship finals against Frölunda HC.

In his fourth season with Skellefteå, Wingerli played his first full season in the SHL in 2017–18, recording 3 goals and 13 points in 52 regular season contests, playing alongside line-mates, Sebastian Ohlsson and Tim Söderlund. Despite his diminutive frame, Wingerli was inserted to use his speed and smarts in the post-season, recording 3 assists in 16 playoff games. Having secured a one-year extension with Skellefteå, in the following 2018–19 season, Wingerli saw increased ice-time and recorded a best of 14 goals and 24 points in 52 regular season games.

After securing an improved two-year contract, Wingerli was named as an alternate captain for Skellefteå entering the 2019–20 season. In 51 appearances, Wingerli finished fourth in team scoring, establishing career marks of 16 goals and 32 points, before the post-season was cancelled due to the COVID-19 pandemic.

In his second season within the leadership group, his seventh with Skellefteå in 2020–21, Wingerli featured in a top six scoring role notching 12 goals and 28 points in 50 regular season games. He collected 2 goals in 12 playoff appearances before suffering a semi-final elimination against Rögle BK.

Having made 288 SHL appearances, recording 104 career points, on 4 June 2021, Wingerli exercised an NHL-out clause in his contract with Skellefteå AIK by agreeing to a one-year, two-way contract with the Colorado Avalanche.

After attending the 2021 Colorado Avalanche training camp, Wingerli was re-assigned and played the entirety of the 2021–22 season in the American Hockey League with affiliate, the Colorado Eagles. Used in a top-nine role, Wingerli missed just 4 regular season games and contributed with 10 goals and 22 points through 64 games.

Following a playoff run with the Eagles, while having been unable to earn a recall to the Avalanche, Wingerli as a pending restricted free agent opted to return to Sweden and resume the final year of his contract with Skellefteå AIK for the 2022–23 season on 15 June 2022.

International play
Wingerli first represented Sweden as a junior at the 2017 World Junior Championships in Montreal/Toronto, Canada. He collected an assist in 7 games helping Sweden to a fourth place finish.

Wingerli was selected to his first senior team, when he was among the Swedish team announced to compete at the 2021 IIHF World Championship in Riga, Latvia. He made his full international debut for Sweden in the Tournament opening game against Denmark in a 4–3 defeat on 22 May 2021. He scored his first international goal, marking the opening goal in a 4–2 defeat to the Czech Republic on 27 May 2021. He finished the tournament with 3 points through 7 round-robin games, as Sweden failed to progress past the group stage with a 9th place finish.

Career statistics

Regular season and playoffs

International

References

External links

1997 births
Living people
Colorado Eagles players
People from Lycksele Municipality
Skellefteå AIK players
Swedish ice hockey left wingers
Sportspeople from Västerbotten County